Chimezie Onwuzulike  (born 31 July 1987) is a Nigerian cricketer. He played in the 2014 ICC World Cricket League Division Five tournament.

In April 2018, he captained Nigeria during the 2018 ICC World Twenty20 African Sub Regional Qualifier tournament. He was the leading run-scorer for the tournament, with 234 runs in six matches.

In September 2018, he was named in Nigeria's squad for the 2018 Africa T20 Cup. He made his Twenty20 debut for Nigeria in the 2018 Africa T20 Cup on 14 September 2018.

In May 2019, he was named in Nigeria's squad for the Regional Finals of the 2018–19 ICC T20 World Cup Africa Qualifier tournament in Uganda. He made his Twenty20 International (T20I) debut for Nigeria against Kenya on 20 May 2019. In October 2019, he was named in Nigeria's squad for the 2019 ICC T20 World Cup Qualifier tournament in the United Arab Emirates. He was the leading run-scorer for Nigeria in the tournament, with 94 runs in six matches.

References

External links
 

1987 births
Living people
Nigerian cricketers
Nigeria Twenty20 International cricketers
Place of birth missing (living people)
Sportspeople from Enugu